The 1958 Hardin–Simmons Cowboys football team was an American football team that represented Hardin–Simmons University in the Border Conference during the 1958 NCAA University Division football season. In its fourth year under head coach Sammy Baugh, the team compiled a 6–5 record (4–0 against conference opponents), won the conference championship, lost to Wyoming in the 1958 Sun Bowl, and outscored all opponents by a total of 176 to 141. The team played its three home games at Parramore Stadium, also known as Parramore Field.

The team's statistical leaders included quarterback Harold Stephens with 706 passing yards, fullback Pete Hart with 785 rushing yards, and end Sammy Oates with 402 receiving yards. Five of the team's players were honored on the 1958 All-Border Conference football team: Hart; Oates; guard Joe Biggs, halfback Dewey Bohling, and tackle Ted Edmondson.

Five Hardin-Simmons players were named to the 1958 All-Border Conference football team: guard Joe Biggs; halfback Dewey Bohling; tackle Ted Edmondson; fullback Pete Hart; and end Sammy Oates.

Schedule

References

Hardin-Simmons
Hardin–Simmons Cowboys football seasons
Border Conference football champion seasons
Hardin-Simmons Cowboys football